Liam Hughes may refer to:

Liam Hughes (footballer, born 1988), English footballer
Liam Hughes (footballer, born 1992), English footballer